The Comorian Women's Cup is a women's association football competition in Comoros. pitting regional teams against each other. It was established in 2007. It is the women's equivalent of the Comoros Cup for men. The last winners was FC Ouvanga Espoir de Moya in 2021.

Finals

Most successful clubs

See also
 Comorian Women's Championship

References

External links 
 Football Féminin - comorosfootball.com

 
Com